The Recession of 1969–1970 was a relatively mild recession in the United States.  According to the National Bureau of Economic Research the recession lasted for 11 months, beginning in December 1969 and ending in November 1970, following an economic slump which began in 1968 and by the end of 1969 had become serious, thus ending the third longest economic expansion in U.S. history which had begun in February 1961 (only the 1990s and 2010s saw a longer period of growth).

At the end of the expansion inflation was rising, possibly a result of increased deficit spending during a period of full employment. This relatively mild recession coincided with an attempt to start closing the budget deficits of the Vietnam War (fiscal tightening) and the Federal Reserve raising interest rates (monetary tightening).

During this relatively mild recession, the Gross Domestic Product of the United States fell 0.6 percent. Though the recession ended in November 1970, the unemployment rate did not peak until the next month. In December 1970, the rate reached its height for the cycle of 6.1 percent.

References

Further reading
 
 

1969 in the United States
1970 in the United States
Recessions in the United States
1960s economic history
1970 in economics
1969 in economics
Presidency of Richard Nixon